Cliff Griffith (February 6, 1916 in Nineveh, Indiana – January 23, 1996 in Rochester, Indiana) was an American racecar driver.

Griffith drove in the AAA and USAC Championship Car series, racing in the 1950–1952, 1956 and 1961 seasons with 19 starts, including the Indianapolis 500 races in each of those years except 1950.  He finished in the top ten 8 times, with his best finish in 4th position, in 1950 at Springfield.  His best Indy finish was 9th in 1952.

Prior to joining USAC, Griffith won a pair of championships on the Midwest Dirt Track Racing Association circuit behind the wheel of Hector Honore's legendary sprint car known as the "Black Deuce".

Indy 500 results

World Championship career summary
The Indianapolis 500 was part of the FIA World Championship from 1950 through 1960. Drivers competing at Indy during those years were credited with World Championship points and participation. Cliff Griffith participated in 3 World Championship races. He started on the pole 0 times, won 0 races, set 0 fastest laps, and finished on the podium 0 times. He accumulated a total of 0 championship points.

References 

1916 births
1996 deaths
Indianapolis 500 drivers
AAA Championship Car drivers
People from Johnson County, Indiana
Racing drivers from Indiana
People from Rochester, Indiana